William Lefevre was a department store located in Canterbury, which later became part of Debenhams.

History
William Lefevre was born in Canterbury in 1847 and whose father was a grocer. After serving his apprenticeship with a draper in the Marylebone area of London, William returned to Canterbury in 1875 to open his own drapery business. 

William's family followed suit by opening drapery and wool business' in other parts of the city. By 1899 the business had stores in Sun Street, Mercury Street and Guildhall Street.

William died in 1911 and his son Charles took over the running of the business. In the 1920s the business took on a massive project by combining their Guildhall store with the Philosophical and Literary Institution and Museum, the Theatre Royal & the Guildhall Tavern. The new store with amended frontage was opened in 1926 and designed by local architects Jenning & Gray, however parts of the original buildings can still be seen, including the Egyptian Windows from the original Institute building.

It was during this time that the business was sold to Debenhams who continued to operate the business under the William Lefevre name until 1973 when the business was re-branded as part of the rationalisation programme.

References

Lefevre William
Lefevre William
Defunct retail companies of the United Kingdom